Hans-Adam I (Johann Adam Andreas; 16 August 1662 – 16 June 1712) was the son of Karl Eusebius, Prince of Liechtenstein (1611–1684) and Princess Johanna Beatrix of Dietrichstein (1625–1676).

On 18 January 1699 he acquired the seigneury of Schellenberg, and on 22 February 1712 the county of Vaduz. These two domains would later form the present principality of Liechtenstein. He was also Duke of Troppau and Jägerndorf.

Johann did not take up an office at the Imperial court but did case-by-case work, especially as a financial expert. He was known informally as Hans Adam the Rich. Besides managing his property, he took a great interest in art. He bought works by Rubens and van Dyck for his collections and was one of the most generous patrons of his time.

Johann created two memorials to himself, a palace in Bankgasse in Vienna and a summer palace in Rossau. He was the 575th Knight of the Order of the Golden Fleece in Austria.

Marriage and issue
Johann married his first cousin, Erdmuthe Maria Theresia of Dietrichstein, Princess of Dietrichstein-Nikolsburg (17 April 1652 – 15 March 1737) on 16 February 1681. They had seven children:
Princess Maria Elisabeth (8 May 1683 – 4 May 1744), married Leopold, Duke of Schleswig-Holstein-Sonderburg-Wiesenburg, son of Karolina of Legnica-Brieg
Prince Karl Joseph (15 October 1684 – 16 February 1704)
Princess Maria Antonia (10 April 1687 – 9 October 1750)
Prince Franz Dominik (1 September 1689 – 19 March 1711)
Princess Maria Gabriele  (12 July 1692 – 7 November 1713), married Joseph Johann Adam, Prince of Liechtenstein
Princess Maria Theresia (11 May 1694 – 20 February 1772)
Princess Maria Dominika (5 August 1698 – 2 June 1724)

He left no male heirs at his death, both of his sons having died before him.

References

External links 
 Princely House of Liechtenstein

1657 births
1712 deaths
People from Brno
People from the Margraviate of Moravia
Princes of Liechtenstein
Knights of the Golden Fleece of Austria
18th-century Liechtenstein people